Sophia Ivanovna Kramskaya (Софья Ивановна Юнкер-Крамская) (1866–1933) was a Russian painter.

Biography
Kramskaya was born in 1866. She was the daughter of the painter Ivan Kramskoi. She was married to George Junker, a lawyer in Saint Petersburg,  who died in 1916.
 
She exhibited her work at the Woman's Building at the 1893 World's Columbian Exposition in Chicago, Illinois.

Kramskaya spent several years in exile in Siberia for producing counter-revolutionary propaganda. Kramskaya died in 1933.

Her painting Girl in the Kokoshnik is in the collection of the Hermitage Museum in Saint Petersburg.

Gallery

References

1866 births
1933 deaths
Russian women painters
19th-century women artists from the Russian Empire
20th-century Russian women artists
19th-century painters from the Russian Empire
20th-century Russian painters